Phyllonorycter acaciella is a moth of the family Gracillariidae. It is found in southern Europe, but not on the Iberian Peninsula and Balkan Peninsula.

The larvae feed on Ulmus glabra, Ulmus laevis and Ulmus minor. They mine the leaves of their host plant. They create a lower-surface (but sometimes upper-surface) weakly folded tentiform mine. The folded side of the mine is ochraceous. The pupa is blackish and found within the mine, in a very loose cocoon.

External links
 bladmineerders.nl
 Fauna Europaea

acaciella
Moths described in 1843
Moths of Europe
Taxa named by Philogène Auguste Joseph Duponchel

Leaf miners